Kreshnik Bahtiri (born 29 July 1992) is a Kosovan professional footballer who plays as a midfielder for Kosovo Superleague club Malisheva.

Club career

Early career and Arbëria
Bahtiri was part of Ulpiana until 2016, where he was also captain. In July 2016, Bahtiri joined Second Football League of Kosovo side Arbëria, where he is appointed captain and for five years helped the team to be promoted first in the First League and then culminating in the Superleague. On 18 September 2020, Bahtiri and a good part of the team made their Superleague debut in a 2–0 away win against Trepça '89, where the first goal of the season, but also of Arbëria in the Superleague was scored by he himself after seventeen minutes of play.

Kukësi
On 2 July 2021, Bahtiri signed a one-year contract with Kategoria Superiore club Kukësi. On 19 September 2021, he was named as a Kukësi substitute for the first time in a league match against Kastrioti. His debut with Kukësi came three days later in the 2020–21 Albanian Cup first round against Maliqi after being named in the starting line-up. Five days after debut, Bahtiri made his league debut in a 2–2 away draw against Laçi after coming on as a substitute at last minutes in place of Shqiprim Taipi.

References

External links

1992 births
Living people
People from Lipljan
Kosovan footballers
Kosovan expatriate footballers
Expatriate footballers in Albania
Kosovan expatriate sportspeople in Albania
Association football midfielders
Football Superleague of Kosovo players
Kategoria Superiore players
FK Kukësi players